is a Korean manhwa series written by Dall-Young Lim and illustrated by Kwang-Hyun Kim, the former who is known for writing Unbalance Unbalance, Zero, and the Japanese manga Black God. The story revolves around Shi-Chan Kang, a high school student and fashion model who was nearly killed in a crossfire between demonic beings called "Tedlars". However, Inferno, one of the Tedlars, saves Shi-Chan's life by merging his body with his own. In order to separate themselves, they must collect 1,000 "Invento Hells" by killing other Tedlars in hopes of ever being separated from each other.

Aflame Inferno began serialization in Vol.8 of Booking, published on April 1, 2006. The first volume was released by Haksan Culture Company on July 15, 2006, with a total of six volumes available in South Korea as of January 15, 2011.

Story
A self-absorbed high school student gets caught in the middle of a battle of demons (called "Tedlars"). He is nearly killed but is saved when the Tedlar named "Inferno" merged with him. Now he must hunt down Tedlars while keeping up with his studies.

Characters
The characters' original names are shown on the left, while their names from the Japanese version appear on the right. Only the Tedlars and TBI members retain their names in both versions.

Main characters
 / 

 / 

Yu-Na Go /

Tedlars

Legend Tedlars

Other Tedlars
Bandara

Sorcerer Dantis

Rabiatan

Garrod Balty

Loben Balty

Altross

Garnet Sittler

Balbalbow

Albraxas

Trisba

Dalrossa

Material

Physaracks

Tedlar Hunters (T.B.I.)
Oreilly Laurent

Guinness Scott

Demian

Nancy Swallow

Other characters
Ji-Yun Do / Mika Matsumi

Mrs. Kang / Hiromi Saito

Ki-Hoon Shin / Akihiko Hosaka

Chi-Sang An / Katsuki Kumakura

Yu-Ra Min / Maya Akakiya

Elize Schultz

Joan

Terminology
Tedlar (테드라/鬼神)

Corrosion

Invento

T.B.I.

Media

Manhwa
Written by Dall-Young Lim and illustrated by Kwang-Hyun Kim, Aflame Inferno began serialization in Vol.8 of Booking, published on April 1, 2006. The first volume was released by Haksan Culture Company on July 15, 2006, with a total of six volumes available in South Korea as of January 15, 2011 under their Booking Comics imprint.

The manhwa is licensed in Japan by Kill Time Communication where it is serialized in Comic Valkyrie, and in Taiwan by Tong Li Publishing. Japanese releases of Aflame Inferno feature unique cover art designs and uncut scenes, as well as being localized to better suit Japanese readers.

References

External links
Aflame Inferno at Comic Valkyrie

2006 comics debuts
Haksan Culture Company titles
Manhwa titles